Silvia is a female given name of Latin origin, with a male equivalent Silvio and English-language cognate Sylvia.  The name originates from the Latin word for forest, Silva, and its meaning is "spirit of the wood"; the mythological god of the forest was associated with the figure of Silvanus. Silvia is also a surname.

In Roman mythology, Silvia is the goddess of the forest while Rhea Silvia was the mother of Romulus and Remus.  Silvia is also the name of one of the female innamorati of the commedia dell'arte and is a character of the Aminta written by Torquato Tasso.

People with the given name
Queen Silvia of Sweden (born 1943), spouse of King Carl XVI Gustaf
Saint Silvia, Italian saint of the 6th century
Silvia Airik-Priuhka, Estonian writer and poetry translator
Silvia Bächli (born 1956), Swiss visual artist
Silvia Barbescu, Romanian painter
Silvia Bellot, Spanish motor racing official 
Silvia Braslavsky, Argentinian chemist 
Silvia Cambir, Romanian painter
Silvia Cartwright, New Zealand Viceroy, jurist
Silvia Ciornei, Romanian politician
Silvia Fuselli, Italian footballer
Silvia Heubach, German-American mathematician
Silvia Intxaurrondo, Spanish journalist
Silvia Laidla, Estonian actress
Sílvia Pérez Cruz, Spanish singer
Silvia Puppo Gastélum, Mexican politician
Silvia Madetzky, German female discus thrower
Silvia Marcovici, Romanian violinist
Silvia Sorina Munteanu, Romanian singer
Silvia Navarro, Mexican actress
Silvia Njirić, Croatian tennis player
Silva Oja (born 1961), Estonian heptathlete
Silvia Pinal, Mexican actress
Silvia Radu, Romanian sculptor
Silvia Rodgers (1928–2006), German-Jewish-British writer and political activist
Silvia Saint, Czech pornographic actress
Silvia Seidel, German actress
Silvia Sommer, Austrian composer, pianist and music producer
Silvia Stroescu, Romanian gymnast
Silvia Tcherassi, Colombian fashion designer 
Silvia Adriana Țicău, Romanian politician
Silvia Vasquez-Lavado, Peruvian-American explorer and mountaineer

People with the surname 

 Alan Silvia, American politician from Massachusetts
 Evelyn Silvia (1948–2006), American mathematician
 Stephen Silvia, American academic
 Tatiana Silva, professional name of Tatiana Silva Braga Tavares (1985), Belgian model and beauty pageant winner

See also
Sylvia (given name)

Italian feminine given names
Romanian feminine given names
Bulgarian feminine given names
Estonian feminine given names
Spanish feminine given names
Swedish feminine given names